Antizafra is a genus of  extinct sea snails, marine gastropod mollusks in the family Columbellidae, the dove snails.

Species
Species within the genus Antizafra include:
 † Antizafra cancellaria (Hutton, 1885)
 † Antizafra obsoleta C. A. Fleming, 1943
 † Antizafra obtusa C. A. Fleming, 1943
 † Antizafra pisanopsis (Hutton, 1885)
 † Antizafra speighti (Marwick, 1924)
 † Antizafra wairarapa L. C. King, 1933
Species brought into synonymy
 Antizafra aoteana Dell, 1956: synonym of Belomitra aoteana (Dell, 1956)
 Antizafra apicibulbus (Tomlin, 1920): synonym of Antimitrella apicibulbus (Tomlin, 1920)
 Antizafra plexa (Hedley, 1902): synonym of Retizafra plexa (Hedley, 1902)
 Antizafra vivens Powell, 1934: synonym of Macrozafra vivens (Powell, 1934)

References

Columbellidae